James Jewell (February 20, 1906 – August 5, 1975) was an American radio actor, producer and director at radio station WXYZ, Detroit, Michigan.

Early life 
Jewell was born in Detroit, Michigan on February 20. 1906. His parents were William I Jewell (born 1873) who immigrated to the US from Canada in 1875, and Clara (born 1881 in Michigan). His grandfather had come to Canada from Ireland with a group of Welsh singers. His mother operated a grocery store in the Corktown section of Detroit.

Professional career 
Jewell first got into radio in 1927. with a background of summer stock, vaudeville, burlesque, and even touring with a troupe of marionettes.
His first professional engagement was in the Jessie Bonstelle stock theater in Detroit as a stage hand. He worked his way up to assistant treasurer, while playing bit parts, and at 21 was acting in the Paramount studios in Queens.

WXYZ 
In June 1932, George Trendle, the owner of radio station WXYZ, decided to drop network affiliation and produce his own radio programs. Jim Jewell was hired as the dramatic director for the radio station. He supplied the actors from his own repertory company, the "Jewell Players".

Jewell was part of the station staff that worked out the original concepts for The Lone Ranger. Jewell is also credited for selecting The William Tell Overture as the theme music for the series. "Ke-mo sah-bee", Tonto's greeting to the masked Ranger, was derived from the name of a boys' camp owned by Jewell's father-in-law Charles W. Yeager. Camp Kee-Mo-Sah-Bee operated from 1911 until 1941 on Mullet Lake south of Mackinac, Michigan. After the radio show became popular, Yeager held "Lone Ranger Camps" at his camp.

Jewell produced, directed and occasionally wrote many of the early episodes for The Lone Ranger and The Green Hornet. He was the director for both series from their beginning up until 1938. He even played the Ranger in one episode. Jewell's sister, Lenore Allman (Lenore Jewell Allman) wanted to play a role in a radio series at WXYZ so Jim wrote her into The Green Hornet. She played Lenore Case, the Green Hornet's secretary, for 28 years and is in the Radio Hall of Fame.

WBBM 
Jewell left WXYZ in 1938, and moved to Chicago and worked as a director-producer at WBBM (AM), the CBS radio affiliate in Chicago.

He directed Jack Armstrong, the All-American Boy beginning in 1938 until the series ended in 1951.
From 1951 to 1955, Jewell was the producer/director of The Silver Eagle, a mountie adventure which ran on ABC and starred Jim Ameche, the brother of movie star Don Ameche.

As the era of radio dramatic series came to an end, attempted to bring The Silver Eagle to television.

Personal life 
Jewell married Mary Martha Yeager in 1933. They had two children James Patrick and Judith. He was 6 feet tall, 200 lbs, black hair and a clipped mustache, In his later years he built marionettes as a hobby in a workshop in the basement of his home in Evanston, Illinois.

He died from a heart attack in Chicago in August 1975.

References 

 Obituary in Time magazine – August 18, 1975

External links 
 Lone Ranger on the Radio

American male radio actors
Male actors from Detroit
1906 births
1975 deaths
20th-century American male actors